Galip Hasan Kuşçuoğlu was the sheikh of Galibi Sufi order.

His life 
Kuşçuoğlu was born on March 27, 1919 in Çorum, Turkey. He is related to the famous Sage of Fatih Sultan Mehmet era, namely Ali Kuşçu who is a descendant of Caliph Omar. Galip Kuşçuoğlu has also kinship relation to the Islamic prophet Muhammad through his maternal kinship relation to Caliph Ali. He has two sisters of whom one is dead. He spent his childhood and adolescence in Çorum and Samsun. He was apprenticed to a carpenter after he dropped out of school at the second grade of secondary school. He married the only daughter of Çorumlu Hacı Mustafa Anac who was also a sheikh. He migrated to Ankara in 1948. He gained an expertise in carpentry, and earned his life by working as a famous craftsman and tradesman in this area. He is also a founding member of the Ankara Carpenters Association (Ankara Marangozlar Derneği) and Ankara Carpentry Complex (Ankara Marangozlar Sitesi).

Sheikh Galib Kuşçuoğlu is the successor of Sheikh Hacı Mustafa Yardımedici who is, in turn, the successor of Seyyid Ali Sezai Kurtaran, who was the active leader of civil resistance against the French occupation forces and Armenian military forces in Maraş during the Turkish War of Independence. The meeting of Galip Kuşçuoğlu with his Sheikh Hacı Mustafa Yardımedici is very interesting. As Mr. Kuşçuoğlu narrates, this meeting occurred after a period of yearning and waiting for his unknown spiritual guide (Murshid).

Kuşçuoğlu who had made various stresses about the necessity of being contemporaneous, also says that thoughts like; “Everyone who says; God exists are Muslims”, “Prophets did not bring Religion, they had appeared as Islam, they had brought the Sharia, all of their Sharia are from Allah, they are named according to the Sharia of the Prophet that they are bound to, like Mohammedian, Christian, Jewish” constitutes the life system. He also believes in the dialogue between different beliefs.

Kuşçuoğlu died on 14 December 2013, in Antalya.

See also
 Interfaith dialogue
 Divine call

References

External links
 Galibi Order

Turkish Sufis
Sufi mystics
1919 births
2013 deaths